The 1945–46 OB I bajnokság season was the ninth season of the OB I bajnokság, the top level of ice hockey in Hungary. 10 teams participated in the league, and BKE Budapest won the championship.

First round

Group A

Group B

Second round

Final round

5th place

External links
 Season on hockeyarchives.info

Hun
OB I bajnoksag seasons
1945–46 in Hungarian ice hockey